Enzo Lilian Marin Loiodice (born 27 November 2000) is a French professional footballer who plays as a midfielder for Segunda División club UD Las Palmas.

Club career

Dijon
Loiodice joined the Dijon youth academy in 2015, moving from FC Gobelins. He made his professional debut for Dijon in a 3–1 Ligue 1 loss to Bordeaux on 28 April 2018.

On 3 July 2018, Loiodice signed his first professional contract with Dijon for three years. On the 25th August 2018, Loiodice provided an assist in an impressive performance against OGC Nice in a 4–0 win. He was named in L'Equipe's team of the week following this performance (Matchday 3).

Wolverhampton Wanderers (loan)
On 29 January 2020 he moved on loan to Premier League club Wolverhampton Wanderers, with the intention to spend the remainder of the season with their under-23 side with a view to a permanent transfer. However, the COVID-19 pandemic caused the game to be suspended in England, cutting any opportunities for Loiodice to impress and he instead returned to France in early June.

Las Palmas
On 18 August 2020, Loiodice switched teams and countries again, after agreeing to a three-year contract with Segunda División side UD Las Palmas.

International career
Loiodice was born in France and is of Italian descent. He is a youth international for France. Loiodice was named in the French squad for the FIFA U-20 World Cup in Poland. Despite being the youngest member of the squad he started for France in their opening two games against Saudi Arabia (2-0 win) and Panama (2-0 win). He was rested for the third game as France had already qualified. He returned to the starting eleven in the next round against USA as France lost narrowly 3–2.

References

External links
 
 
 
 
 
 

2000 births
Living people
Footballers from Paris
French footballers
France youth international footballers
Association football midfielders
Dijon FCO players
Wolverhampton Wanderers F.C. players
UD Las Palmas players
Ligue 1 players
English Football League players
Segunda División players
French expatriate footballers
Expatriate footballers in England
Expatriate footballers in Spain
French expatriate sportspeople in England
French expatriate sportspeople in Spain
French people of Italian descent